Govt. Brojomohun College, Barisal (also BM College) is one of the oldest institutions of higher education in Bangladesh. It is located in the city of Barisal in south-western Bangladesh.

History
On June 14, 1889, Aswini Kumar Dutta founded Brojo Mohan College, which was named after his father, Brajamohan Dutta.

The first principal of the college was Babu Gyan Chandra Chowdhury. While Ashwini Kumar Dutta taught English and logic, Kali Prasanna Ghosh taught history and Kamini Kumar BidyaRatna taught Sanskrit and Bengali. In 1898, BM College was transformed into a "First Grade College" from a "Second Grade College". In 1912, the college went to government management from personal management strategy. In the beginning the college used the BM School campus and was relocated its own present complex sometime later.

BM College, affiliated to University of Calcutta, started honours course in English and philosophy in 1922, in Sanskrit and mathematics in 1925, in chemistry in 1928, and finally in economics in 1929. The time from 1922 to 1948 is called the "Golden Period" of the college. The governor of Bengal at that time, Sir Udbarn, once commented on BM College, "The college promises some day to challenge the supremacy of the metropolitan (Presidency) College."

After the partition of India and Pakistan in 1947, the college lacked teachers and the student body fell to one third of its post-war size. This made it difficult to teach the same numbers of courses and as a result the two year Honors curriculum conducted by Calcutta University was replaced with the three Honors curriculum of Dhaka University. As a consequence, Honors courses except Mathematics were abolished in 1950. In 1952, Honors in mathematics had also been discontinued. In 1964, Honors in economics restarted. Several other Honors and Masters Courses started between 1972 and 2005.

The time since 1965 has been called the "Age of Enrichment" of the college. There are 20 degree (pass) courses, 22 Honors courses and 21 Masters courses at BM College. On 10th January 2014, Honors Course in Statistics was launched under the leadership of Prof. Biplab Kumar Bhattacharjee in collaboration with Prof. Nasim Haider. Professor Biplab Kumar Bhattacharjee was the founding head of the Department of Statistics. Its journey started with only 11 students. HSC course was abolished in 1999.

Academic departments

The university has 22 departments under 4 faculties. The faculties are:

Faculty of Arts
 Department of Bangla 
 Department of English
 Department of History
 Department of Philosophy
 Department of Islamic Studies
 Department of Islamic History and Culture
 Department of Sanskrit

Faculty of Business Studies
 Department of Finance & Banking
 Department of Accounting
 Department of Marketing
 Department of Management

Faculty of  Science
 Department of Botany
 Department of Chemistry
 Department of Mathematics
 Department of Physics
 Department of Soil Science
 Department of Statistics
 Department of Zoology

Faculty of Social Sciences
 Department of Economics
 Department of Sociology 
 Department of Political Science
 Department of Social Work

Notable alumni

 Jibanananda Das, poet, writer, novelist and essayist
 Abdul Wahab Khan, third Speaker of the National Assembly of Pakistan
 Jogendra Nath Mandal, Law minister in Interim Government of India and Pakistan's first law and labour minister
 Bir Sreshtho Mohiuddin Jahangir, awarded the highest recognition of bravery in the Bangladesh Army
 Shaheed (Martyr) Lieutenant Commander Moazzem Hossain, accused of Agartala Conspiracy Case and awarded Independence Day Award, the highest state award given by the government of Bangladesh
 Altaf Mahmud, musician, cultural activist and martyred freedom fighter
 Promode Dasgupta, West Bengal State Secretary of the CPI(M)
 Narayan Gangopadhyay, South Asian author
 Ahsan Habib, poet and writer
 Mizanur Rahman Khan, journalist
 Hafiz Ahmed Mazumder, businessman, educationist and politician
 Sheikh Fazlul Haque Mani, Politician, Founder of Mujib Bahini and Jubo League
 Siraj Sikder Politician, Communist revolutionary
 Professor Biplab Kumar Bhattacharjee was the founding head of the Department of Statistics.

Notable faculty members

 Jibanananda Das, taught English
 Kabir Chowdhury, former principal

References

Colleges in Barisal District
Colleges affiliated to National University, Bangladesh
Education in Barisal
1889 establishments in India
Educational institutions established in 1889